The State of Kansas Notable Book Awards are presented annually for fifteen notable books created by writers, illustrators or book artists who are Kansans or have written about Kansas. The award, originally established in 2006, is organized by the Kansas Center for the Book (KCFB).

Winning authors include Clare Vanderpool, Rolf Potts, Ben Lerner, Candice Millard, and Gordon Parks.

Process
The KCFB is a state affiliate of the Center for the Book in the Library of Congress.  It is a program of the State Library of Kansas.

A committee of KCFB affiliates and fellows, together with authors of previous Notable Books, identifies notable titles from among those published the previous year, and the State Librarian makes the selection for the final list of fifteen. A reception and medal awards ceremony are held to honor the books and their authors and illustrators.

List of winners
Following are the Kansas Notable Book Award winners, listed in alphabetical order by title:

2006
 Airball: My Life in Briefs – L.D. Harkrader
 Capote in Kansas: A Drawn Novel – Ande Parks
 The Darkest Dawn: Lincoln, Booth, and the Great American Tragedy – Thomas Goodrich
 Deputy Harvey and the Ant Cow Caper – Brad Sneed
 The Great Blues – Steve Semken
 A Hungry Heart: A Memoir – Gordon Parks
 In the Small, Small Night – Jane Kurtz
 John Brown, Abolitionist – David S. Reynolds
 The Kansas Guidebook for Explorers – Marci Penner
 Maggie Rose and Sass – Eunice Boeve
 The Moon Butter Route – Max Yoho
 Oceans of Kansas: A Natural History of the Western Interior Sea – Michael J. Everhart
 Ordinary Genius – Thomas Fox Averill
 Wildflowers and Grasses of Kansas: A Field Guide – Michael John Haddock
 The Youngest Brother: On a Kansas Wheat Farm During the Roaring Twenties and the Great Depression – C. Hugh Snyder

2007
Eighteen notable books were selected in 2007, the only year in which it was not a list of fifteen.
 Afoot: A Tale of the Great Dakota Turkey Drive – George Brandsberg
 Angle of Yaw – Ben Lerner
 Ballots and Bullets: The Bloody County Seat Wars of Kansas – Robert K. DeArment
 Flint Hills Cowboys: Tales From the Tallgrass Prairie – James Hoy
 I'd Tell You I Love You, But Then I'd Have To Kill You – Ally Carter
 John Brown to Bob Dole: Movers and Shakers in Kansas – Virgil Dean, Ed.
 John Steuart Curry: The Road Home – Alice Bertels
 Kansas Murals: A Traveler's Guide – Lora Jost & Dave Loewenstein
 Light on Main Street: Storytelling by a Country Newspaper Editor – Rudy Taylor
 The Loose Change of Wonder – Steven Hind
 My Little Yellow Taxi – Stephen Johnson
 Next Year Country: Dust to Dust in Western Kansas, 1890–1940 – Craig Miner
 Not Afraid of Dogs –  Susanna Pitzer
 Ogallala Blue: Water and Life on the High Plains – William Ashworth
 Revolutionary Heart: The Life of Clarina Nichols and the Pioneering Crusade for Women's Rights – Diane Eickhoff
 Shanghai Shadows – Lois Ruby
 The Virgin of Small Plains – Nancy Pickard
 Words of a Prairie Alchemist – Denise Low

2008
 American Shaolin: Flying Kicks, Buddhist Monks, and the Legend of Iron Crotch: An Odyssey in the New China – Matthew Polly
 The Boy Who Was Raised by Librarians – illustrated by Brad Sneed
 Can I Keep My Jersey? 11 Teams, 5 Countries, and 4 Years in My Life as a Basketball Vagabond – Paul Shirley
 The Curse of Catunkhamun – Tim Raglin
 The Farther Shore – Matthew Eck
 From Emporia: The Story of William Allen White – Beverley O. Buller
 Hellfire Canyon – Max McCoy
 Hunger for the Wild: America's Obsession with the Untamed West – Michael L. Johnson
 The Kitchen Sink: New and Selected Poems, 1972–2007 – Albert Goldbarth
 A Matter of Justice: Eisenhower and the Beginning of the Civil Rights Revolution – David A. Nichols
 The Middle of Somewhere – J.B. Cheaney
 The Rest of Her Life – Laura Moriarty
 Sea Monsters: Prehistoric Creatures of the Deep – Michael J. Everhart
 (companion book to Sea Monsters: A Prehistoric Adventure)
 Storm Chaser: A Photographer's Journey – Jim Reed
 Writing in an Age of Silence – Sara Paretsky

2009
 Amelia Earhart: the Legend of the Lost Aviator – Shelley Tanaka, and illustrated by David Craig
 Artfully Done: Food, Flowers & Joy Across Generations – RoxAnn Banks Dicker, Ed.
 Burn – Kathleen Johnson
 Charlatan: America's Most Dangerous Huckster, the Man Who Pursued Him, and the Age of Flimflam – Pope Brock
 A Curse Dark as Gold – Elizabeth C. Bunce
 The Guide to Kansas Birds and Birding Hot Spots – Bob Gress & Pete Janzen
 Hometown Appetites: The Story of Clementine Paddleford, the Forgotten Food Writer Who Chronicled How America Ate – Kelly Alexander & Cynthia Harris
 Kansas Opera Houses: Actors and Community Events 1855–1925 – Jane Glotfelty Rhoads
 Making History: Quilts & Fabric From 1890–1970 – Barbara Brackman
 Marco Polo Didn't Go There: Stories and Revelations From One Decade as a Postmodern Travel Writer – Rolf Potts
 The Nature of Kansas Lands – Beverley Worster, Ed.
 A Passion for Nature: The Life of John Muir – Donald Worster
 The Pizza Hut Story – Robert Spector
 Seeding Civil War: Kansas in the National News, 1854–1858 – Craig Miner
 Survival of Rural America: Small Victories and Bitter Harvests – Richard E. Wood

2010
 Addie of the Flint Hills: A Prairie Child During the Depression – Adaline Sorace, as told to Deborah Sorace Prutzman
 The Blue Shoe: A Tale of Thievery, Villainy, Sorcery, and Shoes – Roderick Townley, and illustrated by Mary GrandPre
 Carter Finally Gets It – Brent Crawford
 The Evolution of Shadows – Jason Quinn Malott
 Ghost Town – Richard W. Jennings
 A Kansas Year – Mike Blair
 Lisa's Flying Electric Piano – Kevin Rabas
 Nothing Right: Short Stories – Antonya Nelson
 One Kansas Farmer: A Kansas Number Book – Devin Scillian & Corey Scillian
 Our Boys: A Perfect Season on the Plains with the Smith Center Redmen – Joe Drape
 Silver Shoes – Paul Miles Schneider
 The Storm in the Barn – written and illustrated by Matt Phelan
 To the Stars: Kansas Poets of the Ad Astra Poetry Project – Denise Low, Ed.
 Under Siege!: Three Children at the Civil War Battle for Vicksburg – Andrea Warren
 Years of Dust: The Story of the Dust Bowl – Albert Marrin

2011
 Amy Barickman's Vintage Notions – Amy Barickman
 And Hell Followed With It – Bonar Menninger
 Appetite for America – Stephen Fried
 Baking With Friends – Sharon Davis & Charlene Patton
 Bound – Antonya Nelson
 Crossing the Tracks – Barbara Stuber
 A Distant Home – George Paris
 Flyover People – Cheryl Unruh
 Ghost Stories of the New West – Denise Low
 Life in a Jar – Jack Mayer
 Moon Over Manifest – Clare Vanderpool
 A Prairie Peter Pan – Beverley O. Buller
 Prairie Rhythms – Lana Wirt Myers
 The Scent of Rain and Lightning – Nancy Pickard
 Star Crossed – Elizabeth C. Bunce

2012
 8 Wonders of Kansas! – Marci Penner
 The Afterlives of Trees – Wyatt Townley
 Amelia Lost: The Life and Disappearance of Amelia Earhart – Candace Fleming
 Bent Road – Lori Roy
 Destiny of the Republic: A Tale of Madness, Medicine and the Murder of a President – Candice Millard
 Doc – Mary Doria Russell
 The Door in the Forest – Roderick Townley
 Liar's Moon – Elizabeth C. Bunce
 My Ruby Slippers: The Road Back to Kansas – Tracy Seeley
 The Northern Cheyenne Exodus in History and Memory – Ramon Powers & James N. Leiker
 Osa and Martin: For the Love of Adventure – Kelly Enright
 Prairie Fire: A Great Plains History – Julie Courtwright
 Rode – Thomas Fox Averill
 Send Me Work: Stories – Katherine Karlin
 Tapped Out: Rear Naked Chokes, the Octagon, and the Last Emperor: an Odyssey in Mixed Martial Arts – Matthew Polly

2013
 The Adventures of Beanboy – Lisa Harkrader
 Beyond Cold Blood: The KBI from Ma Barker to BTK – Larry Welch
 Blackbear Bosin: Keeper of the Indian Spirit – David Simmonds
 The Chaperone – Laura Moriarty
 The Dust Bowl: An Illustrated History – Dayton Duncan & Ken Burns
 (companion book to The Dust Bowl)
 Eisenhower in War and Peace – Jean Edward Smith
 Frontier Manhattan: Yankee Settlement to Kansas Town, 1854–1894 – Kevin G. W. Olson
 A Kansas Bestiary – Jake Vail & Doug Hitt, and illustrated by Lisa Grossman
 May B. – Caroline Starr Rose
 This Ecstasy They Call Damnation – Israel Wasserstein
 Time's Shadow: Remembering a Family Farm in Kansas – Arnold J. Bauer
 To the Stars Through Difficulties: A Kansas Renga in 150 Voices – Caryn Mirriam-Goldberg, Ed.
 A Voice for Kanzas – Debra McArthur
 Wide Open – Larry Bjornson
 The Yard – Alex Grecian

2014
 Biting Through the Skin: An Indian Kitchen in America's Heartland – Nina Mukerjee Furstenau
 The Black Country – Alex Grecian
 Bleeding Kansas, Bleeding Missouri: The Long Civil War on the Border – Jonathan Earle & Diane Mutti Burke, Eds.
 A Death at Crooked Creek: The Case of the Cowboy, the Cigarmaker, and the Love Letter – Marianne Wesson
 Dragging Wyatt Earp: A Personal History of Dodge City – Robert Rebein
 Echoes from the Prairie: A Collection of Short Memoirs – Nicole Muchmore, Ed.
 Edmund G. Ross: Soldier, Senator, Abolitionist – Richard A. Ruddy
 The Good Lord Bird – James McBride
 Navigating Early – Clare Vanderpool
 Needle in the Bone – Caryn Mirriam-Goldberg
 Of Grave Concern: An Ophelia Wylde Paranormal Mystery – Max McCoy
 Teatime to Tailgates: 150 Years at the K-State Table – Jane P. Marshall
 The Thing About Luck – Cynthia Kadohata
 The Tie That Bound Us: The Women of John Brown’s Family – Bonnie Laughlin-Schultz
 Worth the Pain: How Meningitis Nearly Killed Me - Then Changed My Life for the Better – Andy Marso

2015
 999 Kansas Characters: Ad Astra, a Biographical Series – Dave Webb, Terry Rombeck, and Beccy Tanner
 Bluebird – Lindsey Yankey
 A Carol Dickens Christmas: A Novel – Thomas Fox Averill
 Chasing Weather: Tornadoes, Tempests, and Thunderous Skies in Word and Image – Caryn Mirriam-Goldberg and Stephen Locke
 The Darkest Period: The Kanza Indians and Their Last Homeland, 1846-1873 – Ronald D. Parks
 The Devil's Workshop: A Novel of Scotland Yard's Murder Squad – Alex Grecian
 Field Guide to the Common Grasses of Oklahoma, Kansas, and Nebraska – Iralee Barnard
 Girl in Reverse – Barbara Stuber
 The Kansas Relays: Track and Field Tradition in the Heartland – Joe D. Schrag
 Michael Pearce's Taste of the Kansas Outdoors Cookbook – Michael Pearce
 Music I Once Could Dance To – Roy J. Beckemeyer
 The Ogallala Road: A Memoir of Love and Reckoning – Julene Bair
 Railroad Empire across the Heartland: Rephotographing Alexander Gardner's Westward Journey – by James E. Sherow, photographs by John R. Charlton
 Soldiers in the Army of Freedom: The 1st Kansas Colored, the Civil War's First African American Combat Unit – Ian Michael Spurgeo
 Waiting on the Sky: More Flyover People Essays – Cheryl Unruh

2016
 Alphabet School – Stephen T. Johnson
 A Bitter Magic – Roderick Townley
 Bottled: A Mom's Guide to Early Recovery – Dana Bowman
 The Boy Who Became Buffalo Bill: Growing Up Billy Cody in Bleeding Kansas – Andrea Warren
 Diary of a Waitress: The Not-So-Glamorous Life of a Harvey Girl – Carolyn Meyer
 For the Sake of Art: The Story of a Kansas Renaissance – Cynthia Mines
 Harvey Houses of Kansas: Historic Hospitality from Topeka to Syracuse – Rosa Walston Latimer
 Kansas Trail Guide: The Best Hiking, Biking, and Riding in the Sunflower State – Jonathan Conard and Kristin Conard
 Kansas Wildflowers and Weeds – Michael John Haddock, Craig C. Freeman, and Janet E. Bare
 The Madman and the Assassin: The Strange Life of Boston Corbett, the Man Who Killed John Wilkes Booth – Scott Martelle
 Notorious Kansas Bank Heists: Gunslingers to Gangsters – Rod Beemer
 Sun and Moon – Lindsey Yankey
 To Leave a Shadow – Michael D. Graves
 Twenty-Five Years Among the Indians and Buffalo: A Frontier Memoir – by William D. Street, edited by Warren R. Street
 While the Kettle's On – Melissa Fite Johnson

2017
 Fast-Food Sonnets: Poems – Dennis Etzel Jr.
 Ghost Sign: Poems from White Buffalo – Al Ortolani, Melissa Fite Johnson, Adam Jameson, and J.T. Knoll
 Green City: How One Community Survived a Tornado and Rebuilt for a Sustainable Future – Allan Drummond
 Hero of the Empire: The Boer War, a Daring Escape and the Making of Winston Churchill – Candice Millard
 Hurt People: A Novel – Cote Smith
 Ioway Life: Reservation and Reform, 1837-1860 – Greg Olson
 The Last Wild Places of Kansas: Journeys into Hidden Landscapes – George Frazier
 Lost and Gone Forever: A Novel of Scotland Yard’s Murder Squad – Alex Grecian
 The Memory of Lemon: A Novel – Judith Fertig
 Mike Torrez: A Baseball Biography – Jorge Iber
 A Nest of Hornets – Robert Krenzel
 Never Enough Flamingos – Janelle Diller
 Phog: The Most Influential Man in Basketball – Scott Morrow Johnson
 Presenting Buffalo Bill: The Man Who Invented the Wild West – Candace Fleming
 The Small-Town Midwest: Resilience and Hope in the Twenty-First Century – Julianne Couch

 2018 
 Bad Kansas: Stories – Becky Mandelbaum 
 Cricket in the Thicket: Poems about Bugs – Carol Murray and Melissa Sweet
 Dodge City: Wyatt Earp, Bat Masterson, and the Wickedest Town in the American West – Tom Clavin
 Feet of the Messenger: Poems – H.C. Palmer
 Fireflies in the Gathering Dark: Poems – Maril Crabtree
 Headlights on the Prairie: Essays on Home – Robert Rebeinsas
 Ike and McCarthy: Dwight Eisenhower's Secret Campaign Against Joseph McCarthy – David A. Nichols
 Kansas Baseball, 1858-1941 – Mark E. Eberle
 Kansas Guidebook 2 for Explorers – Marci Penner and WenDee Rowe 
 The Man from the Train: The Solving of a Century-Old Serial Killer Mystery – Bill James and Rachel McCarthy James
 Midnight at the Electric – Jodi Lynn Anderson
 The Shape of Ideas: An Illustrated Exploration of Creativity – Grant Snider
 Stark Mad Abolitionists: Lawrence, Kansas, and the Battle over Slavery in the Civil War Era – Robert K. Sutton
 That is My Dream! – Langston Hughes and Daniel Miyares
 To The Stars Through Difficulties – Romalyn Tilghman

 2019 
 American Heart – Laura Moriarty 
 Brown Enough: A Tale of a Mixed-Race Baseball Team Summer of ’56 – Ken Ohm
 Buried in the Suburbs – Jamie Lynn Heller 
 The Deepest Roots – Miranda Asebedo
 The Diaries of Reuben Smith, Kansas Settler and Civil War Soldier – Lana Wirt Myers 
 Eisenhower: Becoming the Leader of the Free World – Louis Galambos
 Elevations: A Personal Exploration of the Arkansas River – Max McCoy
 A Girl Stands at the Door: The Generation of Young Women Who Desegregated America’s Schools – Rachel Devlin
 Heartland: A Memoir of Working Hard and Being Broke in the Richest Country on Earth – Sarah Smarsh
 Night Out – Daniel Miyares
 No Place Like Home: Lessons in Activism from LGBT Kansas – C.J. Janovy
 No Small Potatoes: Junius G. Groves and His Kingdom in Kansas – Tonya Bolden and Don Tate
 The Pastor Wears a Skirt: Stories of Gender and Ministry – Dorothy Nickel Friesen
 The Saint of Wolves and Butchers – Alex Grecian
 Seafire – Natalie C. Parker

 2020 
 Birds, Bones, and Beetles: The Improbable Career and Remarkable Legacy of University of Kansas Naturalist Charles D. Bunker – Charles H. Warner
 A Constellation of Roses – Miranda Asebedo
 Crumbled!: The Misadventures of Nobbin Swill – Lisa Harkrader 
 Follow Me Down to Nicodemus Town – A. LaFaye and Nicole Tadgell 
 Headwinds: A Memoir – Edna Bell-Pearson 
 The Healer's Daughter: A Novel – Charlotte Hinger 
 How to Be a Family: The Year I Dragged My Kids Around the World to Find a New Way to Be Together – Dan Kois 
 Journey to a Promised Land: A Story of the Exodusters (I Am America) – Allison Lassieur  
 Kansas City Chiefs Legends: The Greatest Coaches, Players and Front Office Execs in Chiefs History – Jeff Deters 
 A Perfect Silhouette – Judith Miller
 Petroglyphs of the Kansas Smoky Hills – Rex C. Buchanan, Burke W. Griggs, Joshua L. Svaty
 The Reckless Oath We Made: A Novel – Bryn Greenwood 
 Steel Tide: A Seafire Novel – Natalie C. Parker
 The Topeka School: A Novel – Ben Lerner 
 What Color Is Night? – Grant Snider 

 2021 
 All Hallows' Shadow – Michael D. Graves
 The Amelia Six – Kristin L. Gray
 The Chicken Sisters – KJ Dell’Antonia   
 Croaked!: The Misadventures of Nobbin Swill – Lisa Harkrader
 Farmers Unite!: Planting a Protest for Fair Prices – Lindsay H. Metcalf
 Ladybird, Collected – Meg Heriford
 Un Mango Grows in Kansas – Huascar Medina
 Mawson's Mission: Launching Women's Intercollegiate Athletics at the University of Kansas – L. Marlene Mawson 
 Northern Cheyenne Ledger Art by Fort Robinson Breakout Survivors – Denise Low and Ramon Powers 
 People, Pride, and Promise: The Story of the Dockum Sit-in – Prisca Barnes and Priscella Brown
 Prairie Bachelor: The Story of a Kansas Homesteader and the Populist Movement – Lynda Beck Fenwick
 Premeditated Myrtle: A Myrtle Hardcastle Mystery – Elizabeth C. Bunce
 Swimming Shelter: Poems – Al Ortolani
 What Sound is Morning? – Grant Snider
 World of Wonders: In Praise of Fireflies, Whale Sharks, and Other Astonishments – Aimee Nezhukumatathil

 2022 
 Ava: A Year of Adventure in the Life of an American Avocet – Mandy Kern and Onalee Nicklin
 Blue Collar Saint: Poems – Brenda Leigh White
 Field Journal: Volume XIII, 2021, The Santa Fe Trail – Symphony in the Flint Hills
 From This Moment: A Novel – Kim Vogel Sawyer
 The Greatest Thing: A Story About Buck O'Neil – Kristy Nerstheimer and Christian Paniagua
 Haven’s Secret (The Powers Book 1) – Melissa Benoist, Jessica Benoist, and Mariko Tamaki
 How to Resist Amazon and Why – Danny Caine
 Killing Dragons: Order of the Dolphin – Kristie Clark
 Mad Prairie: Stories and a Novella – Kate McIntyre
 Policing Sex in the Sunflower State: The Story of the Kansas State Industrial Farm for Women – Nicole Perry
 Running Out: In Search of Water on the High Plains – Lucas Bessire
 Stormbreak: A Seafire Novel – Natalie C. Parker
 A Vote for Susanna: The First Woman Mayor – Karen M. Greenwald and Sian James
 White Hot Hate: A True Story of Domestic Terrorism in America's Heartland – Dick Lehr
 Words Is a Powerful Thing: Twenty Years of Teaching Creative Writing at Douglas County Jail'' – Brian Daldorph

References

External links

American literary awards
Kansas culture
Awards established in 2006